The IFFI Award for Best Director (officially known as the Silver Peacock for the Best Director Award) is an honor presented annually at the International Film Festival of India since the 40th IFFI 2009 for the best direction in World cinema. 
Earlier the award was presented as the "Silver Peacock for the Most Promising Asian Director" during "31st IFFI 2000" to "39th IFFI 2008"

Recipients

IFFI Best Director Award (2009–Present)

IFFI Most Promising Asian Director Award (2000–2008)

References

Lists of Indian award winners
International Film Festival of India
Indian film festivals
Festivals in Goa
Awards for best director
Indian film awards